The Parker County Courthouse is an historic building located at Courthouse Square in Weatherford, Texas, the seat of Parker County. Built in 1884–1886, it was the county's fourth courthouse; the first was a wooden building, and the second and third both burned down. Architect Wesley Clark Dodson, who designed at least six courthouses in Texas, designed the Second Empire building. The three-story limestone building is visually divided into five bays; the end and central bays are projecting and feature stone pilasters at their corners. The second-story windows are tall and arched, and the roof line features bracketing around the eaves. The red shingled roof has two mansards atop the ends and a three-story tower in the center; each piece features dormers and a widow's walk, while the tower has louvers and a clock on its upper stories.

The courthouse was added to the National Register of Historic Places on 1965.

See also

National Register of Historic Places listings in Parker County, Texas
Recorded Texas Historic Landmarks in Parker County
List of county courthouses in Texas

References

External links

Courthouses on the National Register of Historic Places in Texas
County courthouses in Texas
Buildings and structures in Parker County, Texas
Wesley Clark Dodson buildings
Clock towers in Texas
Government buildings completed in 1886
National Register of Historic Places in Parker County, Texas
Recorded Texas Historic Landmarks
1886 establishments in Texas